

The Latécoère 500 was a flying boat built in France in 1931 for use on the transatlantic mail route to South America. Designed to a specification by the French aviation ministry, Latécoère also built a passenger-carrying variant, the 501, which actually flew first. The design was a large, parasol-wing monoplane with broad sponsons and a fully enclosed cabin. Three engines were installed on the wing, two tractor-fashion on the leading edge, and one pusher-fashion on the trailing edge.

The Latécoère 500 was not accepted for service due to its poor flying qualities and was soon scrapped. The 501 flew for a while on passenger routes in the Mediterranean.

Variants
 Latécoère 500 - mailplane version (1 built)
 Latécoère 501 - airliner version (1 built)

Specifications (Laté 500)

References

 
 aviafrance.com
 Уголок неба

1930s French mailplanes
Flying boats
5
Three-engined push-pull aircraft
Parasol-wing aircraft
Aircraft first flown in 1932